The 2020–21 CEV Champions League was the 61st edition of the highest level European volleyball club competition organised by the European Volleyball Confederation. 

The tournament has been cancelled due to the 2020 coronavirus outbreak.

Qualification

Pools composition
Drawing of Lots was held on 25 October 2019 in Sofia.

League round
 20 teams compete in the League round.
 The teams are split into 5 groups, each one featuring four teams.
 The top team in each pool and 3 best 2nd placed teams qualify for the quarterfinals. 
All times are local.

Pool A

|}

|}

Pool B

|}

|}

Pool C

|}

|}

Pool D

|}

|}

Pool E

|}

|}

Second place ranking

|}

Quarterfinals
 The winners of the ties qualify for the semifinals.
 In case the teams are tied after two legs, a Golden Set is played immediately at the completion of the second leg.
All times are local.

|}

First leg
|}

Second leg
|}

References

External links
CEV Champions League Volley 2020

CEV Champions League
CEV Champions League
CEV Champions League
CEV Champions League